Wayang golek   is one of the traditional Sundanese puppet arts from West Java, Indonesia. in contrast to the wayang art on other area of Java island that use leather in the production of wayang, wayang golek is a wayang art made of wood. Wayang Golek is very popular in West Java, especially in the Pasundan land area. Today, wayang golek has become an important part of Sundanese culture.

On November 7, 2003, UNESCO designated Wayang the flat leather shadow puppet (wayang kulit), the flat wooden puppet (wayang klitik), and the three-dimensional wooden puppet (wayang golek) theatre, as a Masterpiece of the Oral and Intangible Heritage of Humanity. In return for the acknowledgment, UNESCO required Indonesians to preserve the tradition.

Etymology 
The term wayang golek is the Javanese word, it consists of two words wayang and golek. Wayang for "shadow" or "imagination" and golek for "doll". The words equivalent in the Indonesian are bayang and boneka. In modern daily Javanese and Indonesian vocabulary, wayang can refer to the puppet itself or the whole puppet theatre performance.

History

The history of the Wayang Golek began in the 17th century. Initially, the Wayang Golek art emerged and was born in the north coast of the island of Java especially in Cirebon, the Wayang used is the Wayang Cepak in the form of a papak or flat head. According to legend, Sunan Suci used this Wayang Cepak to spread Islam in the community. At that time, the Wayang Cepak performance still used Cirebonese in its dialogue. The Wayang Golek art began to develop in West Java during the expansion of the mataram sultanate.

Wayang Golek began to develop with Sundanese as a dialogue. In addition to being a medium for spreading religion, Wayang Golek serves to complement thanksgiving or ruwatan events. At that time the puppet show was still without using sindhen as an accompanist. Wayang Golek began using the accompaniment of sinden in the 1920s. Until now the Wayang Golek continues to develop as entertainment for the community, especially in Sundanese land.

In this Wayang Golek show, as with other wayang shows, plays and stories are played by a puppeteer. The difference is the language in the dialogue that is brought is Sundanese language. The standard and the wayang Golek are also the same as wayang kulit, for example in the Ramayana and Mahabharata stories. But the difference is in the character of the clown, the naming and form of the clown have their own version, namely the Sundanese version.

In addition to the Ramayana and Mahabharata stories, there are also stories and carangan stories. In this wayangan story, the mastermind makes his own story line which is usually taken from folklore or daily life. in the story carangan usually contains moral messages, criticism, humor and others - others. In the story carangan is not only used to develop the story, but also to measure the quality of the mastermind in making the story. In this puppet show besides accompanied by sinden also accompanied by Sundanese gamelan such as saron, peking, celery, bonang, kenong, gong, rebab, kempul xylophone, drums and culant drums.

In its development, Wayang Golek remains one of the traditional arts of the pride of the people of West Java. Proven Wayang Golek still colors various events such as ruwatan, thanksgiving and other large events. In addition, some artists continue to develop it with a number of additional creations to make it look attractive and stay sustainable without eliminating the grip in it.

Gallery

See also

 Wayang
 Wayang kulit
 Wayang beber
 Wayang wong
 Wayang klitik

References

Wayang 
Indonesian culture
Traditional drama and theatre of Indonesia